Viva Laughlin is an American musical dramedy television series adapted by Bob Lowry and Peter Bowker (creator of the original series) from the popular BBC British serial, Blackpool, and taking its name from the latter program's sequel, Viva Blackpool. Lowry and Bowker also served as executive producers alongside Hugh Jackman, John Palermo, Paul Telegdy, and Gabriele Muccino. The latter also directed the pilot. It was filmed on location in part at the Morongo Casino Resort & Spa in Cabazon, California for most of the inside casino shots.

Produced by BBC Worldwide, CBS Paramount Network Television, Sony Pictures Television, and Seed Productions, the series was greenlit and given a thirteen-episode order on May 14, 2007. Excerpts from the series were aired in subsequent previews throughout the CBS telecast of the 61st Annual Tony Awards on June 10, 2007.<ref>{{cite news|title = CBS to use The American Theatre Wing's 61st Annual Tony Awards" to showcase multiple promos for Viva Laughlin, a new drama premiering in the fall, executive produced by Tony Award and Emmy Award winner Hugh Jackman|url = http://www.thefutoncritic.com/news.aspx?id=20070607cbs01|publisher = The Futon Critic|date = 2007-06-07}}</ref> CBS aired a preview of the pilot on October 18, 2007 following an episode of CSI: Crime Scene Investigation before broadcasting its official season premiere on October 21, 2007 in its regular timeslot on Sunday nights at 8:00/7:00c, following 60 Minutes.

CBS cancelled Viva Laughlin on October 22, 2007 after airing two episodes, with the Nine Network (in Jackman's home country of Australia) following suit the next day by canceling the show after airing only one episode. Both CBS and Nine filled the show's time slot with repeat episodes of CSI, with The Amazing Race then taking Viva Laughlin's place on CBS on November 4. There are still no plans to air the remaining episodes as of October 2020.

PlotViva Laughlin is a mystery drama musical about businessman Ripley Holden, whose ambition is to run a casino in Laughlin, Nevada. It occasionally has the actors break into contemporary song. Ripley has invested all his money into opening a casino that is nowhere near completion, when his financing suddenly falls through. Needing an investor, Ripley approaches his rival, wealthy casino owner Nicky Fontana; but Fontana wants to own the casino himself, and Ripley turns down the deal. Ripley becomes embroiled in a murder investigation after the body of his ex-business partner is found at his casino.

Cast
Lloyd Owen as Ripley Holden
Mädchen Amick as Natalie Holden
Ellen Woglom as Cheyenne Holden
Carter Jenkins as Jack Holden
Eric Winter as Peter Carlyle
D.B. Woodside as Marcus Henckman
Hugh Jackman as Nicky Fontana
Melanie Griffith as Bunny Baxter
P. J. Byrne as Jonesy

Episodes

Critical reception
Critical reaction to the show was mostly negative. The musical numbers themselves were not criticized as much as the plot, the dialogue and the acting.

The opening line of The New York Times review said, "Viva Laughlin on CBS may well be the worst new show of the season, but is it the worst show in the history of television?"Newsday's review started with, "The stud is a dud. And that's only the first of a dozen problems with CBS' admirably ambitious but jaw-droppingly wrongheaded new musical/murder mystery/family drama Viva Laughlin. Let us count the ways it bombs..."

International broadcasters
The following broadcasters purchased the series:

See alsoCop Rock, a poorly received 1990 ABC series which attempted to combine the genres of musical theater, black comedy, and police proceduralGlee, a more successful television musical that debuted on Fox in 2009SMASH, another television musical that debuted on NBC in 2012Hull High, a 1990 NBC "musical soap opera"
Fame (1982 TV series), ran for 5 seasons, inspiration for GleeZoey's Extraordinary Playlist''
List of television series cancelled after one episode

References

External links
 
 

2007 American television series debuts
2007 American television series endings
2000s American comedy-drama television series
2000s American musical comedy television series
American television series based on British television series
CBS original programming
English-language television shows
Television series by BBC Studios
Television series by Sony Pictures Television
Television series by CBS Studios
Jukebox musicals
Television shows set in Nevada